The thaboura, is a type of a string instrument, evolved from the Greek musical instrument tambouras. It is bigger than tambouras and it has 3 strings or 3 pairs of strings. The thaboura's history stretches back to the Byzantine culture and originated in the medieval Greece times. It is also known as Thabouri ("θαμπούρι"), Thavouri ("θαβούρι") and Thavoura ("θαβούρα").

See also
Greek musical instruments
Greek folk music
Greek music

References
Musipedia: Θαμπούρα

Greek musical instruments
Greek music
Byzantine music